The Dirección de Inteligencia Nacional or DINA was the secret police of Chile during the dictatorship of Augusto Pinochet. The DINA has been referred to as "Pinochet's Gestapo". Established in November 1973 as a Chilean Army intelligence unit headed by Colonel Manuel Contreras and vice-director Raúl Iturriaga, the DINA was then separated from the army and made an independent administrative unit in June 1974 under the auspices of Decree 521. The DINA existed until 1977, after which it was renamed the Central Nacional de Informaciones or CNI.

In 2008, the Chilean Army presented a list of 1,097 DINA agents to Judge Alejandro Solís.

DINA internal suppression and human rights violations 
Under decree #521, the DINA had the power to detain any individual so long as there was a declared state of emergency. Such an administrative state characterized nearly the entire length of the Pinochet government. Torture and rape of detainees was common:

DINA censorship of media 
As of September 11, 1973, the military dictatorship worked with DINA to censor channels, newspapers, and radio transmissions that supported the Popular Socialist Union and supporters. A decree by the Junta established that all public information would have to be inspected and revised by the Junta before airing, and a couple days later an "Office of Censorship" was created to supervise all media. A lot of newspapers received their work back scribbled out with red ink.

Through coercion, murder, and kidnappings, television outlets masked the truth on the coup d'état as a plan by the military of Chile. Various international cable news networks were banned by DINA to prevent the news of the forced coup d'état by the military. Some international networks were convinced to lie by the Junta about social and political aspects of Chile.

The censorship breached particular homes and public services, and on September 23, 1973, DINA sent policemen to register households and institutions. They searched subversive evidence such as books by Pablo Neruda, articles on social sciences, political science, human rights, and those who were rounded up and burned at the Plaza de Armas (Santiago).

Foreign involvement 
The United States backed and supported the Fatherland and Liberty Nationalist Front, which funded and directed the first coup attempt against Allende's regime, known as the Tanquetazo. The CIA established links with DINA after the successful 1973 Chilean coup d'état. Ties were cut, however, after the assassination of Orlando Letelier in Washington DC, which DINA agent Michael Townley was directly tied with and which eventually led to the disbanding of the DINA in 1977.

DINA foreign assassinations and operations

The DINA was involved in Operation Condor, as well as Operation Colombo. In July 1976, two magazines in Argentina and Brazil appeared and published the names of 119 Chilean leftist opponents, claiming they had been killed in internal disputes unrelated to the Pinochet regime. Both magazines disappeared after this one and only issue. Judge Juan Guzmán Tapia eventually asked Chilean justices to lift Pinochet's immunity in this case, called "Operation Colombo", having accumulated evidence that Pinochet had ordered the DINA to plant this disinformation, in order to cover up the "disappearance" and murder by the Chilean secret police of those 119 persons. In September 2005, Chile's Supreme Court ordered the lifting of Pinochet's general immunity from prosecutions, with respect to this case.

Assassinations of Carlos Prats and Orlando Letelier

The DINA worked with international agents, such as Michael Townley, who assassinated former Chilean minister Orlando Letelier in Washington DC in 1976, as well as General Carlos Prats in Buenos Aires, Argentina, in 1974.

Michael Townley worked with Eugenio Berríos on producing sarin in the 1970s, at a laboratory in a DINA-owned house in the district of Lo Curro, Santiago de Chile. Eugenio Berríos, who was murdered in 1995, was also linked with drug traffickers and agents of the Drug Enforcement Administration (DEA).

Accounts of daily life in Chile 
Some writers and journalists that opposed this right-wing regime secretly interviewed people living under DINA. Writers such as Patricia Politzer interviewed people who suffered. Politzer writes about specific incidents in Chile.

One of the accounts is about a mother of a leftist sympathizer who was a victim of forced disappearances in Chile. The mother has never heard nor received any update on her son's status, even after Pinochet was removed from power. Many of those who disappeared or were murdered were never identified and thousands of leftist sympathizers remain missing. These unsolved disappearances and kidnappings have left thousands searching for their relatives in Chile to this day.

There was minimal compensation and children suffered greatly as well. In another interview, Politzer gives an account of a woman who was shot with other leftists and managed to survive. She explains that, had she died at the hands of DINA, her children would have been left behind with no one to look after them. These accounts reveal the lack of consideration of DINA and other agencies that answered to Pinochet. Children would be left behind as orphans. All these accounts in "Fear in Chile", by Patricia Politzer, vividly showed what life was like in Chile under Pinochet.

Replacement of DINA by the CNI 
DINA was replaced by the CNI (Central Nacional de Informaciones) in 1977 and Contreras was replaced by general Odlanier Mena. By that time, DINA had reached its military goals: assassinate the Movimiento de Izquierda Revolucionaria (MIR) leadership and the main leaders of the Popular Unity, the coalition of the parties that had won the 1970 elections. The dissolution of the CNI occurred in 1990 during the Chilean transition to democracy.

After the fall of Pinochet's regime, Contreras was prosecuted in Chile due to crimes against humanity while heading the DINA and sentenced to 12 years in prison for covert kidnappings, a crime that had not been amnestied. However, judge Víctor Montiglio who had replaced judge Juan Guzmán Tapia gave amnesty to Contreras in 2005.

Finally, on June 30, 2008, Contreras was sentenced to two life-sentences, one for the murder of Carlos Prats and one for the murder of his wife, Sofía Cuthbert. He also received an additional 20-year sentence for illicit association.

Other activities 
In an undated letter to Augusto Pinochet, Michael Townley advised him that Virgilio Paz Romero, an anti-Castro Cuban, was taking photographs of British prisons in Northern Ireland in 1975 as a DINA assignment. The photographs were to be used by the Chilean government at the United Nations in New York to discredit the United Kingdom and accuse it of human rights violations. However they arrived too late to be used, and were finally published in El Mercurio.

Beginning in late 2014, in response to a request by then Senate Armed Services Committee Chair Carl Levin, the William J. Perry Center for Hemispheric Defense Studies, a U.S. Department of Defense institution for defense and security studies in the Western Hemisphere, has been under investigation by the Department of Defense Office of Inspector General. Insider national security whistleblower complaints allege that the Center knowingly protected a WJPC professor who belonged to the DINA during the dictatorship of Captain General Pinochet, as well as the clandestine participation of Center officials in the 2009 Honduran coup, gross mismanagement, corruption, homophobia, racism, and sexism. "Reports that NDU hired foreign military officers with histories of involvement in human rights abuses, including torture and extra-judicial killings of civilians, are stunning, and they are repulsive," said Sen. Patrick Leahy, D-Vermont, the author of the "Leahy Law" prohibiting U.S. assistance to military units and members of foreign security forces that violate human rights.

See also
Disappearance of Jorge Müller and Carmen Bueno
Eugenio Berríos
Manuel Contreras
Miguel Krassnoff
Operation Condor
Raúl Iturriaga
Ingrid Olderock

References

External links
 History of the organization
 Memoriaviva (Complete list of Victims, Torture Centres and Criminals) 
 List DINA agents

 
1970s in Chile
1973 establishments in Chile
1977 disestablishments in Chile
Anti-communist organizations
Defunct Chilean intelligence agencies
Operation Condor
Political repression in Chile during the military government (1973–1990)
Secret police